Fenoglio may refer to:

People with the surname
Beppe Fenoglio, an Italian writer
Jérôme Fenoglio (born 1965), French journalist
Virgilio Fenoglio, Argentinian chessmaster

Other
?, a fictional character in the Inkworld trilogy by Cornelia Funke